is an airport located in Okadama-chō, Higashi-ku, Sapporo, Hokkaido,  north of the city center of Sapporo. The airport is also used by the Japan Self-Defense Forces and by corporate and general aviation operators: an adjacent facility houses the air traffic control center for Hokkaido and the Tohoku region. The airport houses the headquarters of Hokkaido Air System.

History
Okadama was constructed between 1942 and 1944 as an airfield for the Imperial Japanese Army. Following Japan's surrender to the United States in 1945, ending World War II, the United States Army Air Forces took over the airfield, using it as a training base until the end of the US occupation in 1952. Following the occupation, the field reverted to the Japan Self-Defense Forces.

Scheduled civilian passenger operations began in June 1956 when North Japan Airlines (later Japan Domestic Airlines, Toa Domestic Airlines and Japan Air System) began service to Memanbetsu. All Nippon Airways began service to Okadama in 1966. These airlines operated propeller service at the airport through the mid-1970s, chiefly using NAMC YS-11 turboprops. Although the airport's main runway was extended from 1,000 to 1,500 m in 1967, most scheduled traffic migrated to New Chitose Airport which was better equipped to handle larger jet aircraft.  In 1974, Toa ceased operations at Okadama and ANA established a new subsidiary, Air Nippon, to handle YS-11 flights at the airport. ANA later replaced its YS-11s with quieter Bombardier Dash 8 turboprops.

In 1995, the city of Sapporo proposed extending the runway to 2,000 m in order to allow jet service at Okadama. This plan met protests from neighboring residents, and was abandoned in 1996. In 1998, local residents agreed to an extension of the runway to 1,500 m in exchange for a cap of 44 daily takeoffs and landings.

ANA, which accounted for 80% of passenger traffic at Okadama, ceased Okadama operations in 2010, leaving JAL affiliate Hokkaido Air System as the airport's only scheduled carrier. The airport terminal (operated by a company 26% owned by the Sapporo government) operated at a slight profit until fiscal year 2009, but the departure of ANA group traffic drove its finances into a net loss. HAC continues to serve the airport using Saab 340 turboprops which have since been replaced by the ATR 42.

In November 2013, Fuji Dream Airlines operated a regional jet charter to Okadama from Komaki Airport in Nagoya, the first passenger jet service in the airport's history.

Airlines and destinations

JGSDF units
Northern Air Corps Headquarters (Beechcraft King Air 350)
Northern Helicopter Corps (H-6, UH-1)
No. 7 Division Airborne
No. 11 Division Airborne

Ground transportation

Buses

北37条東21丁目（旧・丘珠空港入口）- Kita 37-Jō Higashi 21-chome bus stop

It takes about 5 minutes on foot from Airport Terminal to this bus stop and the distance is about 200m.

北36条東27丁目 – Kita 36-Jō Higashi 27-chome bus stop

It takes about 10 minutes on foot from Airport Terminal to this bus stop and distance is about 700m.

Trains

It takes 15 minutes on foot from the Airport Terminal to Subway Sakaemachi Station.

References

External links 

 Okadama Airport, official homepage 

Higashi-ku, Sapporo
Airports in Hokkaido
Japan Ground Self-Defense Force bases
Military airbases established in 1944
1944 establishments in Japan
Buildings and structures in Sapporo